Singer railway station is a two-platformed staffed station serving Clydebank town centre, West Dunbartonshire, Scotland.

Passenger services are provided by ScotRail on behalf of Strathclyde Partnership for Transport.

History 

Constructed in 1907, Singer station took its name from the huge Singer sewing machine factory that it was built to serve. The station is located on a section of track that was realigned to make space for the factory. In addition to this station (still in use today), the original station, which was titled Singer Works, and previously called Kilbowie Road (Old), once boasted six bay platforms for the many workers' trains that ran there. Regular works trains ended in 1967 and the bay platforms, and indeed the factory, have long since gone.

Until 2002, Singer was the nearest station to Kilbowie Park, former home of Clydebank F.C. (1965)

Services 

Singer is served by trains on the half-hourly, all day Monday to Saturdays, on both the Argyle and North Clyde lines. This means Monday to Saturday there is a train every 15 minutes to central Glasgow (alternately to Queen Street L.L. and Central L.L.). There is also one train per day from Oban which calls here in the morning peak to Glasgow Queen Street, This operates via Maryhill and avoids Partick altogether.

References 

 
 
 
 McIntosh Gray, Alastair and Moffat, William (1989). A History of Scotland. Oxford: Oxford University Press. .

External links

 RAILSCOT on Glasgow, Dumbarton and Helensburgh Railway
  Singer railway station video footage.

SPT railway stations
Railway stations in West Dunbartonshire
Former North British Railway stations
Railway stations in Great Britain opened in 1907
Railway stations served by ScotRail
Clydebank